Channel 3 or Channel 3 HD is a Thai free-to-air television network that was launched on 26 March 1970 as Thailand's first commercial television station. Channel 3 is operated by BEC Multimedia Company Limited ("BECM"), a subsidiary of publicly traded company BEC World Public Company Limited. The network is headquartered in the Maleenont Tower of Bangkok.

History 
Channel 3 was launched on 26 March 1970 at 10:00 Bangkok Time by Prime Minister Field Marshal Thanom Kittikachorn. This broadcast area was only limited to the Bangkok Metropolitan Area during its early years. On 1 January 1985, it launched its first teletext service known as Infonet. On 1 January 1987, started to air in stereo and, during the 1990s, its stereo broadcast was introduced into its VHF free-to-air station nationwide. TV3 was also experimenting with bilingual transmission using a second audio track in the 1990s.

During its early years, Channel 3's airtime lasted 6-hours, broadcasting from 16:00 to 22:00, and later expanded to the daytime hours. For a short period of time, it started broadcasting all 24 hours in 1997, but was scuttled due to the 1997 Asian financial crisis. The network resumed its 24-hour airtime on 1 January 2005.

On 1 January 2001, Channel 3 was the first station in Thailand to broadcast a 3D film. The movie, Jaws 3-D, required a pair of 3D glasses bought from certain stores partnered with the network for the event or attained from elsewhere.

In September 2018, Channel 3 (owner by BEC and MCOT) was the last broadcaster to broadcast analog television services in Thailand. The network made the move to digital television in late 2019 on VHF while analogue television ceased transmission on 26 March 2020 at 12:00am (UTC+7), exactly 50 years after the channel's launch.

In 2021, all entertainment programs produced by Tero Entertainment were removed and transferred to Channel 7.

References

External links

Television stations in Thailand
Television channels and stations established in 1970
1970 establishments in Thailand
Mass media in Bangkok
Television channel articles with incorrect naming style
BEC World